is Yukari Tamura's eighth single, released on May 25, 2005.

Track listing
 
 Lyrics: Miku Hazuki
 Composition and arrangement: Kazuya Komatsu
 
 Lyrics: Yuuko Yamano
 Arrangement and composition: Yukari Hashimoto
 candy smile
 Lyrics: Miku Hazuki
 Arrangement and composition: Masatomo Ota

References 

Yukari Tamura songs
Japanese-language songs
2005 singles
2005 songs